Cibo Espresso, commonly Cibo (pronounced: ˈtʃibo), is a café and coffee shop franchise based in Adelaide, South Australia, owned by parent company Retail Zoo.

Founding

It was founded in 2000, and now has 28 locations in South Australia along with 1 each in NSW, Victoria and Queensland. There are plans to further expand interstate. The café aims to deliver traditional Italian food made from local ingredients in an Italian atmosphere.

The chain has significant brand loyalty in Adelaide when compared to the local outlets of larger chains such as Starbucks, Gloria Jean's and Hudsons Coffee.

The company sponsors an Adelaide cycling team, Team Cibo.

See also

 List of coffeehouse chains
 List of Italian restaurants
 South Australian food and drink

References

Coffeehouses and cafés in Australia
Culture of Adelaide
Companies based in Adelaide
Italian restaurants
Italian-Australian culture
Restaurant franchises
Australian companies established in 2000
Food and drink companies established in 2000
Italian restaurants in Australia